Carlastyanax aurocaudatus is a species of fish in the family Characidae native to the Río Cauca in Colombia. C. aurocaudatus is distinguished by several diagnostic morphological features, especially the presence of a hooked third dentary tooth. This species is the only member of its genus.

References

Tetras
Taxa named by Jacques Géry
Taxa named by Carl H. Eigenmann
Monotypic fish genera